Hypatima zesticopa is a moth in the family Gelechiidae. It was described by Edward Meyrick in 1929. It is found in North America, where it has been recorded from the Texas and New Mexico.

References

Hypatima
Taxa named by Edward Meyrick
Moths described in 1929